Andrew is sometimes used as a surname.  It is derived from the given name Andrew.

Notable people with the surname include:

 Ariane Andrew (born 1987), US professional wrestler
 Bruce Andrew (1908–1986), footballer
 Calvin Andrew (born 1986), English footballer
 Charles A. Andrew (died 1932), American politician
 Christopher Andrew (disambiguation) (several people)
 Danny Andrew (born 1990), English footballer
 Gareth Andrew, English cricketer
 Gerardine Andrew, Singaporean prostitute and convicted killer 
 Keith Andrew (1929–2010), English cricketer
 Janice Andrew, Australian swimmer
 Joe Andrew (born 1960), US politician
 John Andrew (born 1993) Irish professional rugby player
 John Albion Andrew (1818–1867), Massachusetts politician
 John Neil Andrew (born 1944), Australian politician
 Jorge Andrew (born 1951), Venezuelan tennis player
 Ricky Andrew (born 1989) Irish rugby union player
 Robert Andrew (disambiguation) (several people)
 Sam Houston Andrew III (born 1941), US musician
 Skylet Andrew (born 1962), table tennis player
 Stuart Andrew (born 1971), British Conservative politician
 Wallace W. Andrew (1850–1919), American politician
 William Andrew (disambiguation) (several people)

See also
Andrews (surname)

English-language surnames